The Bristol group was a group of British warships that were sent to the "Total Exclusion Zone" as reinforcements late in the Falklands War. The majority sailed from the UK on 10 May 1982. The group consisted of:

Destroyers
, Type 82
, Type 42  joined group en route having started in Gibraltar
Frigates
, Type 21 frigate
, Leander class
, Type 21 frigate
, Leander class
, Leander class
Royal Fleet Auxiliaries
RFA Bayleaf, support tanker
RFA Olna, fleet tanker

The group reached the task force around 26 May.

References

Royal Navy ad hoc formations
HMS Cardiff (D108)
Military units and formations of the United Kingdom in the Falklands War